Burba is a surname.

Notable people with this surname include:
 Aleksander Burba, Soviet scholar
 Dave Burba, American baseball player
 Edwin H. Burba Jr., American general
 George Burba, American academic
 Hans-Joachim Burba, German male curler
 Jonas Burba, Lithuanian artist
 Nathan Burba, co-founder of Survios
 Vladas Burba, Lithuanian judoka
 Wolfgang Burba, German male curler an curling coach